The 2010−2011 Volleyleague is the 43rd season of the Greek national volleyball league.

Teams

Regular season 

|}

Playoffs

Semifinals

(1) Iraklis Thessaloniki vs (4) PAOK Thessaloniki (series 2−0) 

|}

(2) Olympiacos vs (3) Panathinaikos (series 2−0) 

|}

Finals

(1) Iraklis Thessaloniki vs (2) Olympiacos (series 0−3) 

|}

Final standings

References 
Official site

Volleyball competitions in Greece
2010 in Greek sport
2011 in Greek sport
2010 in volleyball
2011 in volleyball